Elections to Chichester District Council in West Sussex, United Kingdom were held on 6 May 1976.

The whole council was up for election and resulted in a Conservative majority.

Election result

|}

Ward results

References

1976 English local elections
1976
1970s in West Sussex